Dr. Martin Gleave is a Canadian surgeon and cancer researcher who was appointed to the Order of Canada in 2018.

Gleave is a co-founder and Executive Director of the Vancouver Prostate Centre as well as a head of a department at University of British Columbia.

Gleave's team was recognized in 2010 as the first in the world to develop an anti-clusterin agent.

Awards
 Richard D. Williams MD Prostate Cancer Research Excellence Award
 Eugene Fuller Triennial Prostate Award from the American Urological Association
 Barringer Medal from the American Association of Genitourinary Surgeons
 BC Biotech Innovation and Achievement Award
 BC Innovation Council Frontiers in Research Award
 2013 Aubrey J. Tingle Prize from Michael Smith Foundation for Health Research

References

Year of birth missing (living people)
Living people
Canadian medical researchers
Members of the Order of Canada
Physicians from British Columbia